Popolo means People, may refer to:
 Piazza del Popolo
 Basilica of Santa Maria del Popolo
 Banca del Popolo (disambiguation), various Italian bank

See also
 People (disambiguation)